Mei (Japanese: , Mandarin: 美) is a feminine given name used in various cultures, particularly Japan and China.

Possible writings
Mei can be written using different kanji characters and can mean:
, "sprout, garment"
, "sprout, reliant"
, "bright, reliant"
, "ring or echo"
The name can also be written in hiragana or katakana.

Mei can also be written using different Chinese characters:
美, "beautiful"
梅, "Chinese plum"

People with the given name Mei

From Japan 
Mei (singer) (目井 or 姪), a 12th-century Japanese female puppeteer, prostitute, and imayō-style singer. She taught imayō to Otomae, who in turn taught Emperor Goshirakawa.
May J. (芽生), a Japanese R&B singer
, Japanese ice hockey player
May Nakabayashi (芽依), a Japanese J-Pop artist
Mei Kurokawa, (芽以), a Japanese actress and singer
Mei Nagano (芽郁), a Japanese actress
Mei Shigenobu (メイ), the daughter of Japanese Red Army communist Fusako Shigenobu
Mei Yamazaki (山崎愛生, born 2005) a Japanese singer who is a member of the J-pop girl group Morning Musume

From China
Mei Fong (方凤美), a Chinese-American journalist.
Mei Lin (actress) (梅琳), a Chinese actress.
Mei Hong (chemist), a Chinese-American chemist.
Hong Mei (athlete) (洪梅), a female Chinese athlete.

From other countries
Mei Joni, an Indonesian basketball player.

Fictional characters with the given name Mei

Japanese characters
, a character in the manga series Black Butler
, a character in the picture book and animated movie Arashi no Yoru ni
, a character in the manga series O-Parts Hunter
, a character in the tokusatsu television series Kyōryū Sentai Zyuranger
, a character in the manga Citrus
, a character in the manga series Gakuen Utopia Manabi Straight!
, a character in the anime series High School Fleet
, a character in the anime film My Neighbor Totoro
, a character in the novel Another
, a character in the manga series Ace of Diamond
, a character in the manga series Love Hina
, a character in the visual novel Clannad
, protagonist of the manga series Say "I love you"
, a character in the manga and anime series Naruto
, a character in the manga and anime series Ouran High School Host Club
, a main character in the manga series Fullmetal Alchemist
Mei Hayakawa (早川 芽衣), a character in the manga series Scum's Wish
Mei Hatsume (発目明) a character in the manga series "My Hero Academia"

Other characters
Mei Chang, a Chinese woman who runs the prison commissary in the series Orange Is the New Black
Li Mei, a character in the Mortal Kombat series
 Mei (Overwatch), a playable character in Overwatch and Heroes of the Storm
 Mei Lee, a fictional character from Turning Red
 Mei, a character in the anime series Endro! 
 Mei, a character in ER
 Mei Fong (born 1972), female character who passes as a boy in Hell on Wheels
 Mey-Rin, a character in the manga series Black Butler
Mei, a character from the movie My Neighbor Totoro
 Mei Meido from the manga Kimi no koto ga Dai Dai Dai Dai Daisuki na 100-nin no Kanojo
Liu Mei Fan, a character in the Revue Starlight franchise

See also
Mei (surname)

References

Chinese feminine given names
Japanese feminine given names

ja:メイ